The Carrizo/Comecrudo Nation of Texas, Inc., is a cultural heritage organization of individuals who identify as descendants of the Comecrudo people. Also known as the Carrizo people, the Comecrudo were a historic Coahuiltecan tribe who lived in northern Tamaulipas, Mexico, in the 17th to 19th centuries. 

The Carrizo/Comecrudo Nation of Texas, Inc. is an unrecognized organization. Despite the word nation in its name, it is neither a federally recognized tribe nor a state-recognized tribe.

Organization 
In 1999, the Carrizo/Comecrudo Nation of Texas organized as a 501(c)(3) nonprofit organization, based in Floresville, Texas. Their subject area is human services. They underwent tax forfeiture in 2005 and 2015.

Juan Benito Macias is the organization's registered agent and chairman.

Petition for federal recognition 
The Tribal Council of the Carrizo/Comecrudo Nation of Texas, based in Lubbock, Texas, sent a letter of intent to petition for federal recognition in 1998. The council has not proceeded further in submitting a completed petition for federal recognition.

Activities 
The organization joined Earthjustice in filing a lawsuit to stop construction of a U.S.–Mexican border wall that would have destroyed two cemeteries that are more than 150 years old.

See also 
 Tap Pilam Coahuiltecan Nation

References

External links
 Carrizo/Comecrudo Nation of Texas, Inc.

Cultural organizations based in Texas
Non-profit organizations based in Texas
1999 establishments in Texas
Unrecognized tribes in the United States